Bagnara di Romagna is a comune (municipality) in the Province of Ravenna in the Italian region Emilia-Romagna, located about  southeast of Bologna and about  west of Ravenna. 
 
Bagnara di Romagna borders the following municipalities: Cotignola, Imola, Lugo, Mordano, Solarolo.

Twin towns
Bagnara di Romagna is twinned with:

  Adelmannsfelden, Germany, since 2007
  Saint-Drézéry, France, since 2009

References

External links

 Official website

Cities and towns in Emilia-Romagna